Chanteloup-les-Vignes is a commune and town in the Yvelines department, Île-de-France, north central France.

The town was used for a large part of the film La Haine.

Demographic evolution

See also
Communes of the Yvelines department

References

Communes of Yvelines